The 2016–2017 Vendée Globe is a non-stop solo Round the World Yacht Race for IMOCA 60 class yachts this is the eighth edition of the race.

Summary
The 2016 – 17 race started from Les Sables d'Olonne on 6 November 2016; was the eighth edition of the, with 29 skippers from ten countries. It lasted 124.5 days while going around the three great capes – the Cape of Good Hope (South Africa), Cape Leeuwin (Australia) and Cape Horn (Chile) and saw a record 18 skippers make it to the finish line.

This edition of the race was the first to feature foiling monohull boats equipped with hydrofoils and was therefore closely watched to evaluate the durability of foils in such circumstances. Of note, the four foiling boats sailed by professional skippers that made it to the finish line took the top places, indicating that such appendages are likely to be adopted by other sailors (see table below).
The winner of this edition was Armel Le Cléac'h, finishing on 19 January 2017 in a record breaking time of 74 days, three hours and 35 minutes. Other records were set during the course, including the greatest distance covered by a monohull over the course of 24h, the fastest southbound crossing of the Equator and Cape of Good Hope by Alex Thomson. Winner Armel Le Cléac'h also broke the record for the fastest crossing of Cape Leeuwin, Cape Horn and the Equator (northbound).

The race featured the youngest and oldest skippers ever to complete the race – on consecutive days (Alan Roura, 23 years old; Rich Wilson, aged 66). Also, Didac Costa was forced to return to harbour after less than one hour of sailing as a result of water damage to the boat's electric system. He returned to the race four days later and finished in 14th place.
In addition, Conrad Colman finished under jury rig after dismasting 715 nm from the finish, while running short on food and electric power. The latter was compounded by the fact that his boat – Foresight Natural Energy – was propelled solely by renewable energy sources and the critical speed required for using hydrogenerators as well as sunlight to feed his solar panels were short of par. Colman was the first skipper to complete the Vendée Globe without using fossil fuels, two weeks after breaking his mast.

Race Director for this edition was Denis Horeau who heads the event management team having done the role for the 1989, 2004, 2008 and 2012 editions.

Results

Finishing time 

 Penalised two hours for an involuntary rupture of the propeller shaft scrutineering seal.

Stage times 

This data comes from the official website.

List of participants sailor and boats

Gallery of sailors

Gallery of yachts

Sailors and boat details

References

External links
 Official Website
 Official You Tube Channel
 Official Facebook Page

Vendée Globe
Vendée Globe
Vendée Globe
Vendée Globe
 
Vendée Globe